Kuwait Times is an English-language daily published in Kuwait. It is the first English language paper in the Persian Gulf region.

History and profile
Kuwait Times was founded by Yousuf Saleh Alyan in 1961. The 36-page broadsheet provides in-depth reporting on local events and business news, analysis and editorials on local, regional, and international issues, and entertainment and sports news and features.

The Kuwait Times also publishes the Friday Times, a free 80-page tabloid. It was the first tabloid in the country, offering local commentary, news, and analysis as well as entertainment, sports, and comprehensive features. Its 2001 circulation was 28,000 copies.

The Kuwait Times had a sister Arabic daily newspaper, Alfajer Aljadeed, which was published just for two years, following the invasion of Kuwait.

See also
 List of newspapers in Kuwait

References

1961 establishments in Kuwait
Publications established in 1961
Newspapers published in Kuwait
Mass media in Shuwaikh Port
English-language newspapers published in Arab countries